Club Deportivo Ayense, A.C. is a football club that plays in the Liga TDP. It is based in the city of Ayotlán, Mexico.

History 
The team was founded for the first time in 1988, that year they achieved their first title and promoted to Second Division. In 1990 the team was relegated to Segunda División "B", but, in 1991 they won the divisional title and returned to Segunda División, in the same season, the Ayense was invited to the Primera División promotional playoff. The team disappeared for the first time in the mid-2000s.

In 2019 the team returned to professional football after an agreement between the municipal government and an entrepreneur located in United States. The club was enrolled in Third Division with the name Club Deportivo Ayense A.C.

Players

First-team squad

Honors 
 Segunda División "B"
1990-91
 Tercera División
1988-89

References 

Football clubs in Jalisco
Association football clubs established in 1988
1988 establishments in Mexico